In algebraic geometry, given a morphism of schemes , the diagonal morphism

is a morphism determined by the universal property of the fiber product  of p and p applied to the identity  and the identity .

By definition, X is a separated scheme over S ( is a separated morphism) if the diagonal morphism is a closed immersion. Also, a morphism  locally of finite presentation is an unramified morphism if and only if the diagonal embedding is an open immersion.

Explanation 
As an example, consider an algebraic variety over an algebraically closed field k and  the structure map.

Separated morphism 

Emphasizing the relative point of view, one might equivalently define a scheme to be separated if the unique morphism  is separated.

Notice that a topological space Y is Hausdorff iff the diagonal embedding 

is closed. In algebraic geometry, the above formulation is used because a scheme which is a Hausdorff space is necessarily empty or zero-dimensional. The difference between the topological and algebro-geometric context comes from the topological structure of the fiber product (in the category of schemes) , which is different from the product of topological spaces.

Any affine scheme Spec A is separated, because the diagonal corresponds to the surjective map of rings (hence is a closed immersion of schemes):
.

Let  be a scheme obtained by identifying two affine lines through the identity map except at the origins (see gluing scheme#Examples). It is not separated. Indeed, the image of the diagonal morphism  image has two origins, while its closure contains four origins.

Use in intersection theory 
A classic way to define the intersection product of algebraic cycles  on a smooth variety X is by intersecting (restricting) their cartesian product with (to) the diagonal: precisely,

where  is the pullback along the diagonal embedding .

See also 
regular embedding
Diagonal morphism

References 

Algebraic geometry